Campo Grande was a Portuguese parish (freguesia) in the municipality of Lisbon.  At the administrative reorganization of Lisbon on 8 December 2012 it became part of the parish Alvalade.

Main institutions
University of Lisbon
Biblioteca Nacional de Portugal
Arquivo Nacional da Torre do Tombo
Câmara Municipal de Lisboa's Services
Museu da Cidade
Universidade Lusófona of Lisbon
Sporting Clube de Portugal
Estádio José Alvalade

References 

Former parishes of Lisbon